Majerus or Majérus is a surname. Notable people with the surname include:

Christine Majerus (born 1987), Luxembourgian cyclist
Jacques Majerus (1916-1972), Luxembourgian cyclist
Jean Majerus (1914–1983), Luxembourgian cyclist
Jean Majérus (1891-1961), Luxembourgian cyclist
Marianne Majerus (born 1956), Luxembourgian photographer
Michael Majerus (1954–2009), English geneticist and entomologist
Michel Majerus (1967–2002), Luxembourgian artist
Raymond Majerus (1924–1987), American labor leader; father of Rick 
Rick Majerus (1948–2012), American basketball player and coach; son of Raymond
Caleb Majerus (2002) Professional Golfer and Chill